In mathematics, more specifically in ring theory, a cyclic module or monogenous module is a module over a ring that is generated by one element.  The concept is a generalization of the notion of a cyclic group, that is, an Abelian group  (i.e. Z-module) that is generated by one element.

Definition 

Examples 

 2Z as a Z-module is a cyclic module.
 In fact, every cyclic group is a cyclic Z-module.
 Every simple R-module M is a cyclic module since the submodule generated by any non-zero element x of M is necessarily the whole module M. In general, a module is simple if and only if it is nonzero and is generated by each of its nonzero elements.
 If the ring R is considered as a left module over itself, then its cyclic submodules are exactly its left principal ideals as a ring. The same holds for R as a right R-module, mutatis mutandis.
 If R is F[x], the ring of polynomials over a field F, and V is an R-module which is also a finite-dimensional vector space over F, then the Jordan blocks of x acting on V are cyclic submodules.

Properties 

Every module is a sum of cyclic submodules.

See also 
 Finitely generated module

References 

 
 
 

Module theory